Plantago patagonica is a species of plantain known by the common name woolly plantain. It is native to much of North America, including the southern half of Canada, the western and central United States, and northern Mexico, and parts of southern South America. It grows in many types of habitat, including grassland and woodlands. Atop the peduncle of the inflorescence is a dense cylindrical or somewhat conical spike of several tiny flowers and bracts. The spike is very woolly.

Native Americans including the Navajo, Puebloans, and Hopi used this as a medicinal and ceremonial plant. The Navajo and Puebloans use it for headaches, diarrhea, babies' colic, and to reduce appetite and prevent obesity.

References

External links
Plantago patagonica. The Jepson eFlora 2012.
CalPhotos

patagonica
Flora of North America
Flora of South America